Franklin Parish is a parish located in the northeastern part of the U.S. state of Louisiana. As of the 2020, its population was 19,774. The parish seat is Winnsboro. The parish was founded in 1843 and named for Benjamin Franklin.

Geography

Major highways
  Louisiana Highway 4
  Louisiana Highway 15
  Louisiana Highway 17
  U.S. Highway 425

Adjacent parishes
 Richland Parish  (north)
 Madison Parish  (northeast)
 Tensas Parish  (southeast)
 Catahoula Parish  (south)
 Caldwell Parish  (west)

National protected area
 Tensas River National Wildlife Refuge (part)

Communities

City 
 Winnsboro (parish seat and largest municipality)

Town 
 Wisner

Villages 
 Baskin
 Gilbert

Unincorporated community 
 Crowville

Demographics

As of the 2020 United States census, there were 19,774 people, 7,423 households, and 5,130 families residing in the parish.

Education
Franklin Parish School Board operates local public schools. Franklin Parish High School is the sole public high school in the parish.

The parish also hosts two private schools. One of them, Franklin Academy in Winnsboro, was opened as a segregation academy on September 14, 1970, three weeks after parish schools were ordered by a federal judge to desegregate. Franklin Academy's student body is 97% white, while Franklin Parish High School's is majority Black.

Culture
Franklin Parish hosts the annual Franklin Parish Catfish Festival with music, attractions and hundreds of vendors. The 2018 festival was attended by over 10,000 people in bad weather but usually the draw is between 15,000 and 20,000. People from across the region are attracted by the relatively high vendor count and this has an important economic contribution for local businesses. In past years the festival has included an antique car show, a zoo exhibit for children and an exhibit about Louisiana's contributions during World War II, along with performances from Grammy-winning artists Jo-El Sonnier and Jason Crabb.

Notable people
 Ralph E. King, Winnsboro physician who represented Catahoula, Franklin, and Richland parishes in the Louisiana State Senate from 1944 to 1952 and again from 1956 to 1960
 Anthony "Booger" McFarland, Winnsboro native; All-American football player at Louisiana State University; played in National Football League for Tampa Bay Buccaneers
 Steve Pylant, former sheriff of Franklin Parish; Republican member of the Louisiana House of Representatives, resides in Franklin Parish near Delhi in Richland Parish.
 Regnal Wallace, Louisiana farm broadcaster of radio and television; originally from Crowville
 James M. Stephens, 2nd Circuit Court of Appeals Judge, former 5th District Chief Judge, inventor and Baskin native.

Politics

See also

 National Register of Historic Places listings in Franklin Parish, Louisiana

References

 
Louisiana parishes
1843 establishments in Louisiana
Populated places established in 1843